The Chief of the Defence Force (CDF) is the highest-ranking and most senior military officer in the Australian Defence Force (ADF) and is the principal military advisor to the National Security Committee and the Minister for Defence. The current Chief of the Defence Force is General Angus Campbell, who took office on 6 July 2018.

Responsibilities 
The CDF commands the ADF under the direction of the Minister for Defence and provides advice on matters that relate to military activity, including military operations.  In a diarchy, the CDF serves as co-chairman of the Defence Committee, conjointly with the Secretary of Defence, in the command and control of the Australian Defence Organisation.

The CDF is the Australian equivalent position of what in NATO and the European Union is known as the Chief of Defence, in the United Kingdom is known as the Chief of the Defence Staff, and in the United States is known as the Chairman of the Joint Chiefs of Staff, although with the latter prohibited by law from having operational command authority over the US Armed Forces.

Constitutionally, the Governor-General of Australia, is the de jure Commander-in-Chief of the Australian Defence Force. However, in practice, the Australian Government de facto exercises executive power via the Federal Executive Council. The CDF is appointed by the Governor-General on the advice of his/her ministers. The appointment is politically neutral, as are all military positions, and not affected by a change of government.

Since 4 July 2014, the CDF is appointed for a fixed four-year term under the Defence Act (1903). Prior to this date, the appointment was for three years. The position of CDF is notionally rotated between the Royal Australian Navy, the Australian Army and the Royal Australian Air Force. However, in practice this has not been the case; of eighteen appointees, nine have been from the Army, five from the Navy and four from the Air Force. The current Chief of the Defence Force is General Angus Campbell.

During peacetime, the Chief of the Defence Force is the only four-star officer in the ADF (admiral, general, or air chief marshal). The CDF is assisted by the Vice Chief of the Defence Force (VCDF) and serves as the Chairman of the Chiefs of Service Committee, composed of the service chiefs: the Chief of Navy (CN), Chief of Army (CA), and Chief of Air Force (CAF), all of whom are three-star officers (vice admiral, lieutenant general, and air marshal), as is the VCDF.

History
Prior to 1958 there was no CDF or equivalent; a Chiefs of Staff Committee (COSC) existed but no separate position was established as its senior officer. Instead, the senior service chief served as Chairman of the Chiefs of Staff Committee. In March 1958, Lieutenant General Sir Henry Wells was appointed Chairman, Chiefs of Staff Committee, a role independent of and notionally senior to the Army, Navy and Air Force chiefs. However, Wells and his successors did not command the Australian armed forces in any legal sense; the chairman had only an advisory role in the running of the separate services. In February 1976, COSC was dissolved and the new position of Chief of Defence Force Staff (CDFS) was created with command authority over the ADF. In October 1984 the position was renamed Chief of the Defence Force to more clearly reflect the role and its authority.

Appointments
The following list chronologically records those who have held the post of Chief of the Defence Force or its preceding positions. The official title of the position at that period of time is listed immediately before the officers who held the role. The honours are as at the completion of the individual's term.

|-style="text-align:center;"
|colspan=7|Chairman, Chiefs of Staff Committee

|-style="text-align:center;"
|colspan=7|Chief of Defence Force Staff

|-style="text-align:center;"
|colspan=7|Chief of the Defence Force

Timeline

References

External links
 
 

Leadership of the Australian Defence Force
Military appointments of Australia
 
 
 
 
Australia